Lorena González or Gonzalez may refer to:

 Lorena Gonzalez (California politician), California state representative
 Lorena González (Seattle politician), Seattle city council member
 Lorena González (footballer), Uruguayan footballer